Nyaung-U is the administrative town of Nyaung-U Township of Nyaung-U District in the Mandalay Region of central Myanmar.  It lies on the eastern bank of Ayeyarwaddy River. It is just 4 kilometers away from old Bagan, a popular tourist attraction. The Shwezigon Pagoda is located there. The other popular places in and around Nyaung-U were  
 Htilominlo Pagoda
 Gubyaukgyi Pagoda
 Ahlodawpyae Pagoda and
 Hgnet Pyit Taung Hill

It is the home of Nyaung U Airport. It can be reached by air, by railway, by bus and by boat.

The 8.10 inches (203 mm) rainfall of 19 Oct 2011 was the record breaking one for past 47 years. The previous record was 5.67 inches (144 mm) of 9 Oct 1989. It has a population of 48,528.

Climate

References

External links
Satellite map at Maplandia.com
 http://m.naim.my/the-market-at-nyaung-u/
 http://www.exoticmyanmartravel.com/nyaung_u.htm

Populated places in Mandalay Region
Township capitals of Myanmar